The House of Councillors was the upper house of the Landtag of the Kingdom of Bavaria during its existence both as an independent state and as a federal subject of the German Empire. The House of Councillors was established by the 1818 Constitution of the kingdom, and its composition and powers remained unchanged until its abolition under the 1919 Bamberg Constitution.

History

Modeled after the British House of Lords, the House of Councillors was intended to serve as an intermediary between the Crown and the House of Representatives, and formally served as the lower house's equal. Its members comprised the aristocracy and noblemen, including the royal princes, holders of the crown offices, archbishops, members of the Mediatized Houses in bavaria and hereditary and lifelong nominees of the crown.

The House of Councillors held its sessions in secret, which is one of the reasons why it received little public attention during the Vormärz in Bavaria. Recent research suggests that the power of the House of Councillors far exceeded that of the House of Representatives.

Abolition
From 1919 on under the Bamberg Constitution in the Weimar Republic, the upper house of the Landtag was abolished and its lower house became a unicameral democratic elected assembly.

Presidents of the Imperial Council
1819–1837: Prince Karl Philipp von Wrede
1840: Sebastian von Schrenck
1842–1848: Prince Karl zu Leiningen
1848–1881: Franz von Stauffenberg
1881–1890: Georg von und zu Franckenstein
1891–1893: Karl Fugger von Babenhausen
1893–1904: Ludwig von Lerchenfeld-Köfering
1905–1911: Ernst zu Löwenstein-Wertheim-Freudenberg
1911–1918: Carl Fugger von Glött

References

See also
 Bavarian Senate

Defunct upper houses
State legislatures of Germany
Kingdom of Bavaria